Marcin Zaremba is a Polish historian whose work focuses on how the Communist Regime used Polish nationalism to legitimize itself.

References